Nasrullah Haniff bin Johan (born 25 June 1990) is a Malaysian footballer who plays for Negeri Sembilan as a centre-back.

Club career

Negeri Sembilan
Nasrullah signed a two-year contract with Negeri Sembilan in December 2020.He joined the team Negeri Sembilan FC on a free transfer. Has been with the team for two years and has become a key player throughout 2022. He has helped the team secure fourth place in the Malaysia Super League in 2022. It is an impressive achievement as the team has just been promoted from the Malaysia Premier League in the previous year and had shocked the other Malaysia Super League teams as Negeri Sembilan FC was considered an underdog team. He has made 39 appearances and score 2 goals during his time with Negeri Sembilan FC.

Career statistics

References

External links

1990 births
Living people
People from Negeri Sembilan
Malaysian footballers
NS Betaria F.C. players
DRB-Hicom F.C. players
Terengganu FC players
Negeri Sembilan FA players
Negeri Sembilan FC players
Association football defenders